Idea is a genus of butterflies known as tree nymphs or paper butterflies.  The member species are concentrated around South-East Asia. See Sevenia for the genus of African tree nymphs.

Species
Listed alphabetically:
I. agamarschana (C. & R. Felder, [1865]) – Andaman tree-nymph
I. blanchardi Marchal, 1845 – black-trimmed rice paper
I. durvillei Boisduval, 1832
I. electra (Semper, 1878) – Electra's tree-nymph
I. hypermnestra (Westwood, 1848)
I. iasonia or I. jasonia (Westwood, 1848) – Ceylon tree-nymph
I. idea (Linnaeus, 1763) – rice paper
I. leuconoe Erichson, 1834  – paper kite 
I. lynceus  (Drury, [1773]) – tree-nymph
I. malabarica (Moore, 1877) – Malabar tree-nymph
I. stolli (Moore, 1883) – common tree-nymph
I. tambusisiana Bedford-Russell, 1981 – Bedford-Russell's tree-nymph or Sulawesi tree-nymph

References

External links
Idea at the Natural History Museum Butterflies and Moths of the World project
Flickr Images tagged Idea Nymphalidae

Danaini
 
Nymphalidae genera
Taxa named by Johan Christian Fabricius